Bayt al-Aliyai is a sub-district located in the Al Haymah Al Kharijiyah District, Sana'a Governorate, Yemen. Bayt al-Aliyai had a population of 1781 according to the 2004 census.

References 

Sub-districts in Al Haymah Al Kharijiyah District